Lyuben Khristov (born 15 July 1935) is a Bulgarian gymnast. He competed at the 1960 Summer Olympics and the 1964 Summer Olympics.

References

1935 births
Living people
Bulgarian male artistic gymnasts
Olympic gymnasts of Bulgaria
Gymnasts at the 1960 Summer Olympics
Gymnasts at the 1964 Summer Olympics
Gymnasts from Sofia